The Central District of Bavi County is a district (bakhsh) in Bavi County, Khuzestan Province, Iran. At the 2006 census, its population was 44,319, in 8,029 families.  The district has two cities: Sheyban and Mollasani.  The district has one rural district (dehestan): Mollasani Rural District.

References 

Bavi County
Districts of Khuzestan Province